Bill O'Brien (3 January 1905 – 24 October 1988) was an Australian rules footballer who played with South Melbourne in the Victorian Football League (VFL).

O'Brien later served in the Australian Army during World War II.

He is the grandfather of Gerard Healy and Greg Healy.

Notes

External links 

1905 births
1988 deaths
Australian rules footballers from Victoria (Australia)
Sydney Swans players
Australian Army personnel of World War II
Military personnel from Victoria (Australia)